Martin Bajčičák (born June 12, 1976 in Dolný Kubín) is a Slovak cross-country skier who has been competing since 1994. His best finish at the FIS Nordic World Ski Championships was fourth in the 15 km + 15 km double pursuit in 2005.

Bajčičák's best finish at the Winter Olympics was also in the 15 km + 15 km double pursuit, though it was eighth in 2006.

His only individual World Cup victory came in 15 km event in Germany in 2005. Bajčičák also has seven FIS race victories up to the 15 km + 15 km double pursuit distance from 2000 to 2006.

Cross-country skiing results
All results are sourced from the International Ski Federation (FIS).

Olympic Games

World Championships

World Cup

Season standings

Individual podiums
1 victory – (1 ) 
3 podiums – (2 , 1 )

References

External links
 
 
 

1976 births
Cross-country skiers at the 1998 Winter Olympics
Cross-country skiers at the 2002 Winter Olympics
Cross-country skiers at the 2006 Winter Olympics
Cross-country skiers at the 2010 Winter Olympics
Cross-country skiers at the 2014 Winter Olympics
Living people
Olympic cross-country skiers of Slovakia
Slovak male cross-country skiers
Tour de Ski skiers
Slovak mountain runners
People from Dolný Kubín
Sportspeople from the Žilina Region
Universiade gold medalists for Slovakia
Universiade medalists in cross-country skiing
Competitors at the 1997 Winter Universiade
Competitors at the 1999 Winter Universiade